Maysville is an unincorporated community and a census-designated place (CDP) located in and governed by Chaffee County, Colorado, United States. The population of the Maysville CDP was 135 at the United States Census 2010. The Salida post office (Zip Code 81201) serves the area.

Geography

Demographics

See also

Outline of Colorado
Index of Colorado-related articles
State of Colorado
Colorado cities and towns
Colorado census designated places
Colorado counties
Chaffee County, Colorado

References

External links

Maysville @ ColoradoArtifactual.com
Maysville @ GhostTowns.com
Maysville School
Chaffee County website

Census-designated places in Chaffee County, Colorado
Census-designated places in Colorado